Gwendolyn Willow Wilson (born August 31, 1982) is an American comics writer, prose author, and essayist. Her best-known prose works include the novels Alif the Unseen and The Bird King. She is most well known for relaunching the Ms. Marvel title for Marvel Comics starring a 16-year-old Muslim superhero named Kamala Khan. Her work is most often categorized as magical realism.

Early life 
Wilson was born on August 31, 1982, in Monmouth County, New Jersey, and grew up in Morganville. Wilson lived in the county until she was 12. However, in an interview with Newsrama in 2013, she erroneously said she was born in Morris County and spent the first ten years of her life there. Her parents were atheists who renounced Protestantism in the late 1960s, hence Wilson was not raised in a religious household. Wilson first encountered comics when she read an anti-smoking pamphlet featuring the X-Men in the fifth grade. The characters fascinated her and she began watching the cartoon X-Men every Saturday. Two years later she and her family moved to Boulder, Colorado, where Wilson continued to pursue her interest in comics and other forms of popular culture such as tabletop role-playing games.

Converting to Islam 
After high school, Wilson attended Boston University to pursue a degree in history. During her sophomore year, Wilson began experiencing adrenal problems  and the associated discomfort resulted in her studying a number of religions, including Buddhism, Judaism, Christianity, and Islam. After studying Judaism she focused on Islam, which appealed to her because "to become a Muslim is sort of a deal between you and God." The 9/11 terrorist attack set back her religious studies – fearing she had misjudged the religion – but she later resumed her studies.

In 2003, shortly before her graduation, Wilson agreed to teach English in Cairo. During the plane journey, Wilson converted to Islam; claiming she "made peace with God. I called him Allah." According to Butterfly Mosque, upon arrival in Cairo, Wilson secretly practiced Islam but after becoming engaged to an Egyptian she began to practice it more openly. She and her roommate resided in Tura, a district in Cairo, Egypt. The pair soon met a physics teacher named Omar who offered to show them around and act as a cultural guide. Months later, Wilson and Omar became engaged. Later, she moved with him back to the United States, with Wilson returning to her writing career, and Omar becoming a legal advocate for refugees.

Career
Wilson's writing career began from her work as a freelance music critic for DigBoston. After moving to Cairo, she contributed articles to the Atlantic Monthly, The New York Times Magazine, and the National Post. She was also a regular contributor to the now-defunct Egyptian opposition weekly Cairo Magazine. Wilson was the first Western journalist to be granted a private interview with Ali Gomaa after his promotion to the position of Grand Mufti of Egypt. Additionally, Wilson released a memoir titled The Butterfly Mosque about life in Egypt during the Mubarak regime, which was named a Seattle Times Best Book of 2010.

Her first graphic novel, Cairo, with art by M.K. Perker, was published by Vertigo in 2007, and named one of the best graphic novels of 2007 by Publishers Weekly, The Edmonton Journal/CanWest News, and Comics Worth Reading. The paperback edition of Cairo was named one of Best Graphic Novels for High School Students in 2008 by School Library Journal, and one of 2009's Top Ten Graphic Novels for Teens by the American Library Association.

Her first ongoing comic series, Air, launched by Vertigo in 2008 reunited her with Perker, and was nominated for an Eisner Award for 'Best New Series' of 2009. NPR named Air one of the top comics of 2009, and it also received acclaim from the Fairfield Weekly, Comic Book Resources, Marie Claire, and Library Journal. Other works for DC include fill-in issues #704 and 706 of Superman, the five-issue mini-series Vixen: Return of the Lion, starring the Justice League member Vixen with art by CAFU, and The Outsiders.

Wilson then wrote Mystic (2011), a four-issue miniseries for Marvel Comics with art by David Lopez. Although a CrossGen revival, Willow's Mystic bears little resemblance to its previous incarnation.

Her debut novel Alif the Unseen (Grove/Atlantic) won the 2013 World Fantasy Award for best novel.

In 2014, Marvel debuted a new Ms. Marvel series written by Wilson. The book stars Kamala Khan, a Muslim teenager living in Jersey City, New Jersey, who takes up the mantle after the previous Ms. Marvel, Carol Danvers, took up the name Captain Marvel.

In November 2018, Wilson began writing Wonder Woman from DC Comics. The character battles Ares in an arc entitled "The Just War."

Her March 2019 novel, The Bird King, tells the story of Fatima, a concubine in the royal court of Granada, the last emirate of Muslim Spain, and her dearest friend Hassan, the palace mapmaker. Hassan has a secret: he can draw maps of places he's never seen and bend the shape of reality.

In 2020, she is writing The Dreaming from DC Comics, with art by Nick Robles and starting with issue #19. The series is part of The Sandman Universe.

Creating Kamala Khan 
Wilson had already had a few forays into the comic book industry, having worked on titles such as Superman and Vixen previously. She received an email for an interview with David Gabriel, a senior vice-president at Marvel Entertainment. By that point Wilson was almost finished with her second novel, but she took the time to speak with him. Shortly thereafter she was offered to co-create a new version of Ms. Marvel named Kamala Khan alongside Sana Amanat, a director and editor at Marvel Entertainment. The process of crafting Kamala was detailed, both artists wished to create a teenage Muslim American girl. Before settling on her Pakistani heritage the two debated the idea of making her a Somali American girl. While creating Kamala as a character the duo expected negativity, not just from people who were anti-Muslim, but also from Muslims who believed Kamala should be portrayed in a certain way. The crafting also focused on smaller details, Wilson did not believe Kamala should have worn a hijab due to a majority of teenage Muslim American girls not wearing them. Despite their initial fears, Kamala was received positively. Some sources described her as easy to relate to, even likening her to a modern-day Peter Parker. Others even viewed Kamala as a symbol for equality and representation among different religions.

Personal life
Since 2007, Wilson has lived in Seattle with her husband, Omar.  She has two daughters.

Awards

Award wins
2012 – Middle East Book Award—Youth Literature: Alif the Unseen
2013 – Pacific Northwest Booksellers Association Award—Regional Book: Alif the Unseen
2013 – World Fantasy Award—Novel: Alif the Unseen
2014 – Broken Frontier Awards—Best Writer, Mainstream
2015 – Hugo Award—Best Graphic Story: Ms. Marvel
2016 – Dwayne McDuffie Award for Diversity in Comics: Ms. Marvel
2019 - American Book Award: Ms. Marvel

Nominations
2009 – Eisner Awards—Best New Series: Air, by G. Willow Wilson and M. K. Perker (Vertigo/DC) (nomination)
2012 – Flaherty-Dunnan First Novel Prize—First Novel (finalist): Alif the Unseen
2013 – Baileys Women's Prize for Fiction—Fiction (Nominee): Alif the Unseen
2013 – John W. Campbell Memorial Award—Novel (Third Place): Alif the Unseen
2013 – Locus Award—First Novel (Nominee): Alif the Unseen
2015 – Eisner Awards: Best New Series: Ms. Marvel, by G. Willow Wilson & Adrian Alphona (Marvel) (nomination)
2015 – Eisner Awards: Best Writer (nomination)
2015 – Dwayne McDuffie Award for Diversity: Ms. Marvel, by G. Willow Wilson & Adrian Alphona (Marvel) (nomination)
2015 – Harvey Awards: Best Writer (nomination)
2015 – Harvey Awards: Best New Series: Ms. Marvel (nomination)
2016 – Eisner Awards: Best Writer

Bibliography

Comics

AiT/Planet Lar
Negative Burn vol. 2 #7–10, "Aces" (with Shannon Eric Denton and Curtis Square-Briggs) collected in Aces: Curse Of The Red Baron (tpb, 112 pages, 2008 )

Dark Horse Comics/Berger Books
Invisible Kingdom #1–present (with Christian Ward, October 2019-ongoing)

DC Comics
Batman Black and White
 "Metamorphosis" (with Greg Smallwood, in #1, 2020)
The Outsiders: Five of a Kind – Metamorpho/Aquaman #1, "Rogue Elements" (with Joshua Middleton, August 2007) collected in Outsiders: Five of a Kind (tpb, 160 pages, 2008)
Vixen: Return of the Lion (limited series) (October 2008 – February 2009)
Vixen: Return of the Lion (tpb, 128 pages, 2009) collects:
 "Predators" (with CAFU, in #1, 2008)
 "Prey" (with CAFU, in #2, 2008)
 "Sanctuary" (with CAFU, in #3, 2008)
 "Risen" (with CAFU, in #4, 2009)
 "Idols" (with CAFU, in #5, 2009)
Superman #704, 706 (with Leandro Oliveira and Amilcar Pinna, 2010) collected in Superman: Grounded Vol. 1 (hc, 168 pages, 2011)
 Wonder Woman #58-72, 74-81 (with Cary Nord, Alejandro Germánico, Emanuela Lupacchino, and Jesús Merino, 2018–2019)
 Poison Ivy (2022)

Vertigo
Cairo (graphic novel, with M.K. Perker, hc, 160 pages, November 2007 )
Air (August 2008 – August 2010)
Volume 1: Letters from Lost Countries (tpb, 144 pages, 2009) collects:
 "Letters from Lost Countries" (with M.K. Perker, in #1–3, 2008)
 "Masks and Other Memories" (with M.K. Perker, in #4, 2008)
 "The Engine Room" (with M.K. Perker, in #5, 2008)
Volume 2: Flying Machine (tpb, 128 pages, 2009) collects:
 "The Secret Life of Maps" (with M.K. Perker, in #6, 2009)
 "The Picture of Zayn al Harrani" (with M.K. Perker, in #7, 2009)
 "Her Own Devices" (with M.K. Perker, in #8, 2009)
 "Mass Transit" (with M.K. Perker, in #9, 2009)
 "Place of the Egrets" (with M.K. Perker, in #10, 2009)
Volume 3: Pureland (tpb, 168 pages, 2010) collects:
 "Sweet as the Tongue" (with M.K. Perker, in #11, 2009)
 "Pureland" (with M.K. Perker, in #12–14, 2009)
 "Air Heart" (with M.K. Perker, in #15, 2009)
 "Infinite Shades" (with M.K. Perker, in #16, 2009)
 "The Picture of Blythe Alice Cameron" (with M.K. Perker, in #17, 2010)
Volume 4: A History of the Future (tpb, 168 pages, 2011) collects:
 "Reveille" (with M.K. Perker, in #18, 2010)
 "A History of the Future" (with M.K. Perker, in #19–21, 2010)
 "Wild Blue Yonder" (with M.K. Perker, in #22, 2010)
 "Dogfight!" (with M.K. Perker, in #23, 2010)
 "The Last Horizon" (with M.K. Perker, in #24, 2010)
The Unexpected, "Dogs" (anthology, with Robbi Rodriguez, October 2011) collected in The Unexpected (tpb, 160 pages, 2013)

Marvel Comics
Girl Comics vol. 2 #1, "Moritat" (with Ming Doyle, March 2010).
Women of Marvel #1, "Thrones" (with Peter Nguyen, November 2010)
Mystic vol. 2 (4-issue limited series, with David López, August–November 2011, collected in The Tenth Apprentice, tpb, 96 pages, 2012)
Ms. Marvel vol. 3 #1–19 (with Adrian Alphona, February 2014 – October 2015)
Volume 1: No Normal (tpb, 120 pages, 2014) collects:
 "Garden State of Mind" (with Adrian Alphona, in All-New Marvel NOW! Point One #1.NOW, 2014)
 "Meta Morphosis" (with Adrian Alphona, in #1, 2014)
 "All Mankind" (with Adrian Alphona, in #2, 2014)
 "Side Entrance" (with Adrian Alphona, in #3, 2014)
 "Past Curfew" (with Adrian Alphona, in #4, 2014)
 "Urban Legend" (with Adrian Alphona, in #5, 2014)
Volume 2: Generation Why (tpb, 136 pages, 2015) collects:
 "Healing Factor" (with Jake Wyatt, in #6–7, 2014)
 "Generation Why" (with Adrian Alphona, in #8–11, 2014–2015)
Volume 3: Crushed (tpb, 112 pages, 2015) collects:
 "Loki in Love" (with Elmo Bondoc, in #12, 2015)
 "Crushed" (with Takeshi Miyazawa, in #13–15, 2015) 
Volume 4: Last Days (tpb, 120 pages, 2015) collects:
 "Last Days" (with Adrian Alphona, in #16–19, 2015)
Ms. Marvel vol. 4 #1-38 (November 2015 – April 2019)
Volume 5: Super Famous (tpb, 136 pages, 2016) collects:
 "Super Famous" (with Adrian Alphona and Takeshi Miyazawa, in #1–3, 2015–2016)
 "Army of One" (with Nico Leon, in #4–6, 2016)
Volume 6: Civil War II (tpb, 136 pages, 2016) collects:
 "The Road to War" (with Adrian Alphona, in #7, 2016)
 "Civil War II" (with Takeshi Miyazawa and Adrian Alphona, in #8–11, 2016)
 "The Road to War" (with Mirka Andolfo, in #12, 2016)
Volume 7: Damage Per Second (tpb, 136 pages, 2017) collects:
 "Election Day" (with Mirka Andolfo, in #13, 2016)
 "Damage Per Second" (with Takeshi Miyazawa, in #14–17, 2017)
 "Meanwhile in Wakanda" (with Francesco Gaston, in #18, 2017)
X-Men vol. 4 #23–26 (January 2015 – April 2015)
Volume 5: The Burning World (tpb, 96 pages, 2015) collects:
 "The Burning World" (with Roland Boschi, Javi Fernandez, in #23–26, 2015)
A-Force vol. 1 (5-issue limited series with Marguerite Bennett and Jorge Molina, May–October 2015, collected in Volume 0: Warzones!, tpb, 112 pages, 2015)
A-Force vol. 2, #1–4 (January–April 2016)
Volume 1: Hypertime #1–4, Avengers #0 (with Jorge Molina and Kelly Thompson, tpb, 146 pages, 2016)
All-New, All-Different Avengers Annual #1, "Internet Randos" (with Mahmud Asrar, August 2016)
Generations: Ms. Marvel #1 (with Paolo Villanelli, September 2017) collected in Generations (hc, 328 pages, 2017)

Novels
The Butterfly Mosque (memoir, Grove Press, hardcover, June 2010, ; paperback, June 2011)
Alif the Unseen, (Grove/Atlantic, July 2012)
The Bird King, (Grove Press, March 2019),

References

External links

1982 births
Living people
21st-century American novelists
American comics writers
Boston University alumni
Female comics writers
Women science fiction and fantasy writers
American expatriates in Egypt
American women novelists
American Muslims
Converts to Islam from atheism or agnosticism
American women journalists
Journalists from New Jersey
Novelists from New Jersey
Journalists from Colorado
Novelists from Colorado
Writers from Boulder, Colorado
People from Monmouth County, New Jersey
Marvel Comics writers
Marvel Comics people
DC Comics people
Hugo Award-winning writers
World Fantasy Award-winning writers
21st-century Muslims
21st-century American women writers